George Davies (25 December 1875–23 July 1959) was a Welsh international rugby union forward who played club rugby for Llandeilo and Swansea. A two time Triple Crown winner, Davies would represent his country on nine occasions. A skillful player, Davies was unfortunate to be playing during the same period as Rhys Gabe, who was the selectors' first choice at his position. It was all the more unfortunate for Davies as it was a collision between himself and Gabe, during a Swansea match, that caused an injury that would allow Gabe to take his position for Wales.

Rugby career
Davies originally played rugby at the lower-level team Llandeilo, whom he captained for two seasons, but on moving to Swansea impressed enough to be capped for Wales. In 1905, he was part of the Swansea team that faced the Original All Blacks on their first British tour.

Davies was first capped for Wales on 6 January 1900 against England, partnered with his Swansea colleague, Dan Rees. He would play for Wales another eight times, scoring a try against Ireland in 1900, and converting four goals in the 1905 Triple Crown winning season. When he was recalled for the 1905 tournament he was switched from centre to fullback for all three matches.

International matches played
Wales
  1900, 1901, 1905
  1900, 1901, 1905
  1900, 1901, 1905

Bibliography

References

Welsh rugby union players
Wales international rugby union players
Rugby union centres
Rugby union fullbacks
1875 births
1959 deaths
Swansea RFC players
Rugby union players from Carmarthenshire